Morgan Uriah Herbert (4 August 1918 – 15 June 2000) was an Australian cricketer. He played eighteen first-class matches for Western Australia between 1945/46 and 1954/55. In October 1947, he took his best bowling figures of 7 wickets for 45 runs, against the touring Indian team.

See also
 List of Western Australia first-class cricketers

References

External links

 

1918 births
2000 deaths
Australian cricketers
Western Australia cricketers